Lourdoueix-Saint-Michel is a commune in the Indre department in central France.

Population

See also
Communes of the Indre department

References

External links

Official site

Communes of Indre